Lacramarca River is an intermittent stream that flows through the Santa Province of Peru to the Pacific Ocean.

Other coordinates:

See also
List of rivers of Peru
List of rivers of the Americas by coastline

References

Rivers of Peru
Rivers of Ancash Region